The freguesias (civil parishes) of Portugal are listed in by municipality according to the following format:
 concelho
 freguesias

Tábua
Ázere
Candosa
Carapinha
Covas
Covelo
Espariz
Meda de Mouros
Midões
Mouronho
Pinheiro de Coja
Póvoa de Midões
São João da Boa Vista
Sinde
Tábua
Vila Nova de Oliveirinha

Tabuaço
Adorigo
Arcos
Barcos
Chavães
Desejosa
Granja do Tedo
Granjinha
Longra
Paradela
Pereiro
Pinheiros
Santa Leocádia
Sendim
Tabuaço
Távora
Vale de Figueira
Valença do Douro

Tarouca
Dálvares
Gouviães
Granja Nova
Mondim da Beira
Salzedas
São João de Tarouca
Tarouca
Ucanha
Várzea da Serra
Vila Chã da Beira

Tavira
Cabanas de Tavira
Cachopo
Conceição
Luz de Tavira
Santa Catarina da Fonte do Bispo
Santa Luzia
Santo Estêvão
Santa Maria
Santiago

Terras de Bouro
Balança
Brufe
Campo do Gerês
Carvalheira
Chamoim
Chorense
Cibões
Covide
Gondoriz
Moimenta
Monte
Ribeira
Rio Caldo
Souto
Valdosende
Vilar
Vilar da Veiga

Tomar
Além da Ribeira
Alviobeira
Asseiceira
Beselga
Carregueiros
Casais
Junceira
Madalena
Olalhas
Paialvo
Pedreira
Sabacheira
Santa Maria dos Olivais
São Pedro de Tomar
Serra
Tomar (São João Baptista)

Tondela
Barreiro de Besteiros
Campo de Besteiros
Canas de Santa Maria
Caparrosa
Castelões
Dardavaz
Ferreirós do Dão
Guardão
Lajeosa
Lobão da Beira
Molelos
Mosteirinho
Mosteiro de Fráguas
Mouraz
Nandufe
Parada de Gonta
Sabugosa
Santiago de Besteiros
São João do Monte
São Miguel do Outeiro
Silvares
Tonda
Tondela
Tourigo
Vila Nova da Rainha
Vilar de Besteiros

Torre de Moncorvo
Açoreira
Adeganha
Cabeça Boa
Cardanha
Carviçais
Castedo
Felgar
Felgueiras
Horta da Vilariça
Larinho
Lousa
Maçores
Mós
Peredo dos Castelhanos
Souto da Velha
Torre de Moncorvo
Urros

Torres Novas
Alcorochel
Assentiz
Brogueira
Chancelaria
Lapas
Meia Via
Olaia
Paço
Parceiros de Igreja
Pedrógão
Riachos
Ribeira Branca
Torres Novas (Salvador)
Torres Novas (Santa Maria)
Torres Novas (Santiago)
Torres Novas (São Pedro)
Zibreira

Torres Vedras
A dos Cunhados
Campelos
Carmões
Carvoeira
Dois Portos
Freiria
Maceira
Matacães
Maxial
Monte Redondo
Outeiro da Cabeça
Ponte do Rol
Ramalhal
Runa
São Pedro da Cadeira
Silveira
Torres Vedras (Santa Maria do Castelo e São Miguel)
Torres Vedras (São Pedro e Santiago)
Turcifal
Ventosa

Trancoso
Aldeia Nova
Carnicães
Castanheira
Cogula
Cótimos
Feital
Fiães
Freches
Granja
Guilheiro
Moimentinha
Moreira de Rei
Palhais
Póvoa do Concelho
Reboleiro
Rio de Mel
Sebadelhe da Serra
Souto Maior
Tamanhos
Terrenho
Torre do Terrenho
Torres
Trancoso (Santa Maria)
Trancoso (São Pedro)
Valdujo
Vale do Seixo
Vila Franca das Naves
Vila Garcia
Vilares

Trofa
Alvarelhos
Bougado (Santiago)
Bougado (São Martinho)
Coronado (São Mamede)
Coronado (São Romão)
Covelas
Guidões
Muro

T